Solaropsis, also known by the common name sundial snails or sun snails, is a genus of air-breathing land snails, terrestrial pulmonate gastropod mollusks in the family Solaropsidae.

Distribution 
Distribution of Solaropsis include: 

Central America:
 Costa Rica 

South America:
 Colombia
 Bolivia
 Guyana
 Brazil
 northeastern Argentina

Species
Species within the genus Solaropsis include:
 
Solaropsis alcobacensis Salvador & Simone, 2015
 Solaropsis amazonica (Pfeiffer, 1854)
 Solaropsis andicola L. Pfeiffer
 Solaropsis anguicula (Hupé, 1853)
 Solaropsis angulifera F. Haas, 1955
 Solaropsis anomala Pilsbry, 1957
 Solaropsis bachi Ihering, 1900
 Solaropsis brasiliana (Deshayes, 1831)
 Solaropsis caperata F. S. Silva, Mendes-Júnior & Simone, 2022
 Solaropsis castelnaudii (Hupé & Deville, 1850)
 Solaropsis catenifera L. Pfeiffer, 1854
 Solaropsis cearana (F. Baker, 1914)
 Solaropsis chicomendesi Cuezzo & I. Fernández, 2001
 Solaropsis cicatricata Beck, 1837
 Solaropsis cousini Jousseaume, 1887
 Solaropsis derbyi (Ihering, 1900)
 Solaropsis diplogonia (Dohrn, 1882)
 Solaropsis elaps Dohrn, 1882
 Solaropsis fairchildi Bequaert & Clench, 1938
 Solaropsis feisthameli (Hupé, 1853)
 Solaropsis gibboni (L. Pfeiffer, 1846)
 Solaropsis heliaca (d’Orbigny, 1835)
 Solaropsis incarum (Philippi, 1869)
 Solaropsis inornata Haas, 1951
 Solaropsis johnsoni Pilsbry, 1933
 Solaropsis juruana (Ihering, 1905)
 Solaropsis leopoldina (Strubel, 1895)
 Solaropsis marmatensis L. Pfeiffer
 Solaropsis monile (Broderip, 1832)
 Solaropsis monolacca (L. Pfeiffer, 1857)
 Solaropsis nimbus (Simone, 2010)
 Solaropsis nubeculata (Deshayes, 1831)
 Solaropsis palizae Weyrauch, 1956
 Solaropsis pascalia (Cailliaud, 1857)
 Solaropsis pellisboae (Hupé, 1853)
 Solaropsis penthesileae Salvador, 2021
 Solaropsis pilsbryi Ihering, 1900 
 Solaropsis pizarro (Pilsbry, 1944)
 Solaropsis planior (Pilsbry, 1889)
 Solaropsis praestans L. Pfeiffer, 1854
 Solaropsis punctata (Wagner, 1827)
 Solaropsis rosarium (Pfeiffer, 1849)
 Solaropsis rugifera Dohrn, 1882
 Solaropsis selenostoma L. Pfeiffer, 1854
 Solaropsis serpens (Spix, 1827)
 Solaropsis tiloriensis (Angas, 1879)
 Solaropsis trigonostoma Haas, 1934
 Solaropsis undata (Lightfoot, 1786)
 Solaropsis undata F. Haas, 1966 (homonymy: a secondary junior homonym of Solaropsis undata ([Lightfoot], 1786). There is no recognized synonym or substitute name available, and a replacement name may be necessary if the species is confirmed to be valid).
 Solaropsis venezuelensis Preston, 1909
 Solaropsis vipera (Pfeiffer, 1859)

Species brought into synonymy
 Solaropsis catenulata (Ancey, 1890): synonym of Solaropsis marmatensis (L. Pfeiffer, 1855)
 * Solaropsis kuhni L. Pfeiffer: synonym of Solaropsis nubeculata (Deshayes, 1831)
 Solaropsis paravicinii Ancey, 1897: synonym of Solaropsis heliaca (d'Orbigny, 1835)
 Solaropsis pellisserpentis Chemnitz: synonym of Solaropsis undata ([Lightfoot], 1786)

Ecology 
Solaropsis lives in rain forests.

Solaropsis aff. fairchildi has been found to feed on flesh meat in the laboratory.

References

 Pilsbry, H. A. (1926). The land mollusks of the Republic of Panama and the Canal Zone. Proceedings of the Academy of Natural Sciences of Philadelphia. 78: 57-126, plates 9-10.
 Pilsbry, H. A. (1933). Zoological results of the Matto Grosso expedition to Brazil in 1931,-II. Mollusca. Proceedings of the Academy of Natural Sciences of Philadelphia. 85: 67-76 + 1 plate.
 Weyrauch, W.K. (1956). Neue Landschnecken aus Peru. Archiv für Molluskenkunde, 85 (4/6): 145-164, pl. 11. Frankfurt am Main.
 Cuezzo M. G. (2002). "On Solaropsis Beck: New anatomical data and its systematic position within Helicoidea (Pulmonata, Stylomatophora)". Papeis avulsos de Zool., São Paulo 42(3): 31-46.
 Simone, L. R. L. (2010). A new genus and species of camaenid from the Amazon Rainforest, Brazil (Pulmonata , Helicoidea). Journal of Conchology. 40(2): 149-161

External links 
  Beck, H. (1837-1838). Index molluscorum praesentis aevi musei principis augustissimi Christiani Frederici. 124 pp. Hafniae 
 Wagner, J. A. (1827). Testacea fluviatilia quae in itinere per Brasiliam annis MDCCCXVII-MDCCCXX (1817-1820) jussu et auspiciis Maximiliani Josephi I. Bavariae Regis augustissimi suscepto, collegit et pingenda curavit Dr. J. B. de Spix (...), digessit, descripsit et observationibus illustravit Dr. J. A. Wagner. Munich: C. Wolf. pp. i-iv, 1-36, plates 1-29.
 Miller, K. (1878). Die Binnenmollusken von Ecuador. Malakozoologische Blätter. 25: 153-199
 Breure, A. S. H. & Araujo, R. (2017). The Neotropical land snails (Mollusca, Gastropoda) collected by the “Comisión Científica del Pacífico.”. PeerJ. 5, e3065.

Pleurodontidae
Gastropod genera